Harold Washington Library-State/Van Buren, (formerly Library-State/Van Buren, formerly State/Van Buren), is an 'L' station serving the CTA's Brown, Orange, Pink, and Purple Lines. Originally, the station was to have direct access to the second floor of the Harold Washington Library building, but this direct connection was never built. Farecard transfers are also available at the station for the Red and Blue Lines via the Jackson/State and Jackson/Dearborn subway stations, respectively. It was originally known as State/Van Buren when it first opened in 1897. The original station closed on September 2, 1973, along with six other stations, due to low ridership, and demolished in 1975. The new station was rebuilt and reopened on June 22, 1997 in order to serve the Harold Washington Library. The Chicago Transit Authority board voted unanimously on Wednesday, October 6, 2010, to rename the station to its current name.

Bus connections

CTA
2 Hyde Park Express (Weekday Rush Hours only)
6 Jackson Park Express
10 Museum of Science and Industry (Memorial Day-Labor Day Only)
22 Clark (Owl Service)
24 Wentworth (Weekdays only)
29 State
36 Broadway
62 Archer (Owl Service)
146 Inner Lake Shore/Michigan Express
147 Outer DuSable Lake Shore Express

Notes and references

Notes

References

External links 

Harold Washington Library-State/Van Buren Station Page

Dearborn Street exit-only stairs from Google Maps Street View
State Street entrance from Google Maps Street View

CTA Brown Line stations
CTA Orange Line stations
CTA Purple Line stations
CTA Pink Line stations
Historic American Engineering Record in Chicago
Railway stations in the United States opened in 1997